Derbyshire County Cricket Club in 1981 represents cricket season when the English club Derbyshire had been playing for one hundred and ten years. It was the season when they won National Westminster Bank Trophy. They won ten matches in the John Player League to finish fourth. In the County Championship, they won four matches to finish twelfth in their seventy-seventh season in the Championship. They were eliminated at group level in the Benson & Hedges Cup.

1981 season

Derbyshire played 22 games in the County Championship, and one match against the touring Australians of which they won four altogether Geoff Miller was in his third season as captain. Peter Kirsten was top scorer overall, in the County Championship and in the NWB Trophy, although John Wright scored most in the John Player League. Paul Newman and David Steele tied on 46 for most wickets in the County Championship, although Newman took an extra first class wicket against the Australians. Barry Wood took most wickets in the John Player League, and Colin Tunnicliffe most wickets in the NWB Trophy.

The club took on two wicket keepers in the season Michael Deakin as a stop gap and Bernie Maher who saw several years service with the club. Another player making his debut was Dallas Moir who went on to play several seasons for Derbyshire.

Matches

First Class

John Player League

National Westminster Bank Trophy

Benson and Hedges Cup

Statistics

Competition batting averages

Competition bowling averages

Wicket Keeping
Bob Taylor
County Championship Catches 33, Stumping 12
John Player League  Catches 12, Stumping 5
NWB Trophy Catches 10, Stumping 2
B & H Trophy Catches 1, Stumping 1
Bernie Maher
 County Championship Catches 6, Stumping 2

See also
Derbyshire County Cricket Club seasons
1981 English cricket season

References

1981 in English cricket
Derbyshire County Cricket Club seasons